Lucy Clare Horobin (born 17 October 1979 in Canterbury, Kent) is a British radio presenter well-known for presenting Heart London Drivetime with Jason King. She attended Nottingham Trent University where she achieved a BA (Hons) in Broadcast Journalism.

Career
Horobin began radio presenting at Trent FM alongside Jason King, and then with Rich Clarke on the evening show which was branded Rich and Luce. Horobin and Clarke then moved to Bauer Radio owned Key 103 to present In:Demand, which later became networked on Hits Radio stations in the North of England, and digital station The Hits Radio. In November 2011 she left In:Demand.

On 23 January 2012 she and Jason King debuted as presenters of Heart Breakfast on Heart Solent. From 4 August 2012 the duo had also presented Saturday breakfast on Heart. From 13 until 29 August 2012 she and King presented Heart Breakfast on Heart London, in the absence of Harriet Scott and Jamie Theakston, meaning they were absent from their usual show on Heart Solent. In January 2013, Lucy along with Jason King moved to Heart London to present weekday drivetime. For a time they also presented the networked Saturday breakfast.

Horobin was brought in as a temporary co-host for Theakston between the departure of Emma Bunton and the arrival of Amanda Holden.

As of 21 June 2019 she presents weekday drivetime and Saturday mid-mornings on Heart Dance.

As of August 2019, she is a stand in presenter on the new Heart national Breakfast and covers for Holden.

In 2020 amid the COVID-19 crisis Horobin joined a supergroup of celebrities called The Celebs which included Frank Bruno and X Factor winner Sam Bailey to raise money for both Alzheimer's Society and Action for Children. They recorded a new rendition of Merry Christmas Everyone by Shakin' Stevens and it was released digitally on 11 December 2020, on independent record label Saga Entertainment. The music video debuted exclusively on Good Morning Britain the day before release. The song peaked at number two on the iTunes pop chart.

References

Alumni of Nottingham Trent University
British radio presenters
Living people
Heart (radio network)
1979 births
People from Canterbury